Kurt Richard Burnette (born 7 November 1955) is an American Catholic prelate who serves as the Bishop of Passaic in the Ruthenian Greek Catholic Church. He succeeded Bishop William C. Skurla. Burnette was appointed on October 29, 2013, by Pope Francis, and enthroned in a Divine Liturgy at the Cathedral of St. Michael the Archangel in Passaic, New Jersey on December 4. 

On 20 October 2020, Pope Francis named Burnette as apostolic administrator of the former Slovak Catholic Eparchy of Saints Cyril and Methodius of Toronto. On 3 March, 2022, Pope Francis changed the jurisdiction and circumscription of the eparchy to establish the Exarchate of Saints Cyril and Methodius of Toronto. Burnette was appointed apostolic administrator of this new exarchate. 

In January 23, 2023, Burnette was appointed as apostolic administrator of both the Ruthenian Eparchy of Parma and the Eparchy of the Holy Protection of Mary of Phoenix. These appointments, noted as being temporary, have made Burnette the leader of over half of the Byzantine Catholic eparchies worldwide.

See also

 Catholic Church hierarchy
 Catholic Church in the United States
 Historical list of the Catholic bishops of the United States
 List of Catholic bishops of the United States
 Lists of patriarchs, archbishops, and bishops

References

External links

 Ruthenian Catholic Eparchy of Passaic Official Site
His Grace, Most Reverend Kurt R. Burnette - The Carpathian Connection
Kurt Burnette, Byzantine Catholic Eparchy of Passaic

Episcopal succession

1955 births
American Eastern Catholic bishops
People from Fakenham
People from King's Lynn and West Norfolk (district)
Ruthenian Catholic bishops
21st-century Eastern Catholic bishops
Living people
Bishops appointed by Pope Francis